Bevendale is a rural town located in the Southern Tablelands in New South Wales, Australia. The Hume Highway passes through the south of Bevendale.

The area has little to no mobile phone reception. Dalton is the nearest service town, with residents also heading to Gunning to trade in the markets there.

See also

 Gunning
 Dalton
 Goulburn
 Yass

Notes

References

Towns in New South Wales
Southern Tablelands
Upper Lachlan Shire